Melba Tolliver (born 1939) is an American journalist and former New York City news anchor and reporter. She is best remembered for her defiant stance against ABC owned WABC-TV when she refused to don a wig or scarf to cover up her Afro in order to cover the White House wedding of President Richard Nixon's daughter Tricia Nixon in 1971.

Tolliver was born in Rome, Georgia.

She worked as a registered nurse and later became a secretary at ABC in November 1966. Strikes by the American Federation of Television and Radio Artists in April 1967 and by the National Association of Broadcast Employees and Technicians in September led to short stints where Tolliver filled in for Marlene Sanders.

Tolliver later became a full-time reporter and anchor at WABC from 1967 to 1976. In the early 1970s, she was a recurring panelist on What's My Line?. In 1976, she went to WNBC where she remained until 1980. She also worked at News 12 Long Island from 1986 to 1994.

Tolliver has co-hosted, with Gil Noble, ABC's Like It Is series which focused upon the Black Community.  Melba Tolliver has a blog on her website and is working on a book about her experiences in the media. She is also featured in the documentary, "In Our Heads About Our Hair." In 2015 Tolliver received a Distinguished Alumni Award from Empire State College.

References

External links

Black Journalists Movement at Robert C. Maynard Institute for Journalism Education

1939 births
African-American television personalities
American women television journalists
Living people
Television anchors from New York City
New York (state) television reporters
People from Rome, Georgia
21st-century African-American people
21st-century African-American women
20th-century African-American people
20th-century African-American women